In physics, a squeezed coherent state is a quantum state that is usually described by two non-commuting observables having continuous spectra of eigenvalues. Examples are position  and momentum  of a particle, and the (dimension-less) electric field in the amplitude  (phase 0) and in the mode  (phase 90°) of a light wave (the wave's quadratures).  The product of the standard deviations of two such operators obeys the uncertainty principle:

Trivial examples, which are in fact not squeezed, are the ground state  of the quantum harmonic oscillator and the family of coherent states  . (In literature different normalizations for the quadrature amplitudes are used. Here we use the normalization for which the sum of the ground state variances of the quadrature amplitudes directly provide the zero point quantum number ).

The term squeezed state is actually used for states with a standard deviation below that of the ground state for one of the operators or for a linear combination of the two. The idea behind this is that the circle denoting the uncertainty of a coherent state in the quadrature phase space (see right) has been "squeezed" to an ellipse of the same area. Note that a squeezed state does not need to saturate the uncertainty principle.

Squeezed states of light were first produced in the mid 1980s. At that time, quantum noise squeezing by up to a factor of about 2 (3 dB) in variance was achieved, i.e. . As of 2017, squeeze factors larger than 10 (10 dB) have been directly observed.

Mathematical definition

The most general wave function that satisfies the identity above is the squeezed coherent state (we work in units with )

where  are constants (a normalization constant, the center of the wavepacket, its width, and the expectation value of its momentum). The new feature relative to a coherent state is the free value of the width , which is the reason why the state is called "squeezed".

The squeezed state above is an eigenstate of a linear operator

and the corresponding eigenvalue equals . In this sense, it is a generalization of the ground state as well as the coherent state.

Operator representation 
The general form of a squeezed coherent state for a quantum harmonic oscillator is given by

For a quantum harmonic oscillator of angular frequency , these operators are given by

Therefore, a squeezed coherent state saturates the Heisenberg uncertainty principle , with reduced uncertainty in one of its quadrature components and increased uncertainty in the other.

Examples
Depending on the phase angle at which the state's width is reduced, one can distinguish amplitude-squeezed, phase-squeezed, and general quadrature-squeezed states. If the squeezing operator is applied directly to the vacuum, rather than to a coherent state, the result is called the squeezed vacuum.

As can be seen in the illustrations, in contrast to a coherent state, the quantum noise for a squeezed state is no longer independent of the phase of the light wave. A characteristic broadening and narrowing of the noise during one oscillation period can be observed. The probability distribution of a squeezed state is defined as the norm squared of the wave function mentioned in the last paragraph. It corresponds to the square of the electric (and magnetic) field strength of a classical light wave. The moving wave packets display an oscillatory motion combined with the widening and narrowing of their distribution: the "breathing" of the wave packet. For an amplitude-squeezed state, the most narrow distribution of the wave packet is reached at the field maximum, resulting in an amplitude that is defined more precisely than the one of a coherent state. For a phase-squeezed state, the most narrow distribution is reached at field zero, resulting in an average phase value that is better defined than the one of a coherent state.

In phase space, quantum mechanical uncertainties can be depicted by the Wigner quasi-probability distribution. The intensity of the light wave, its coherent excitation, is given by the displacement of the Wigner distribution from the origin. A change in the phase of the squeezed quadrature results in a rotation of the distribution.

Photon number distributions and phase distributions
The squeezing angle, that is the phase with minimum quantum noise, has a large influence on the photon number distribution of the light wave and its phase distribution as well.

For amplitude squeezed light the photon number distribution is usually narrower than the one of a coherent state of the same amplitude resulting in sub-Poissonian light, whereas its phase distribution is wider. The opposite is true for the phase-squeezed light, which displays a large intensity (photon number) noise but a narrow phase distribution. Nevertheless, the statistics of amplitude squeezed light was not observed directly with photon number resolving detector due to experimental difficulty.

For the squeezed vacuum state the photon number distribution displays odd-even-oscillations. This can be explained by the mathematical form of the squeezing operator, that resembles the operator for two-photon generation and annihilation processes. Photons in a squeezed vacuum state are more likely to appear in pairs.

Classification

Based on the number of modes
Squeezed states of light are broadly classified into single-mode squeezed states and two-mode squeezed states, depending on the number of modes of the electromagnetic field involved in the process. Recent studies have looked into multimode squeezed states showing quantum correlations among more than two modes as well.

Single-mode squeezed states
Single-mode squeezed states, as the name suggests, consists of a single mode of the electromagnetic field whose one quadrature has fluctuations below the shot noise level  and the orthogonal quadrature has excess noise. Specifically, a single-mode squeezed vacuum (SMSV) state can be mathematically represented as,

where the squeezing operator S is the same as introduced in the section on operator representations above. In the photon number basis, writing  this can be expanded as,

which explicitly shows that the pure SMSV consists entirely of even-photon Fock state superpositions.
Single mode squeezed states are typically generated by degenerate parametric oscillation in an optical parametric oscillator, or using four-wave mixing.

Two-mode squeezed states
Two-mode squeezing involves two modes of the electromagnetic field which exhibit quantum noise reduction below the shot noise level in a linear combination of the quadratures of the two fields. For example, the field produced by a nondegenerate parametric oscillator above threshold shows squeezing in the amplitude difference quadrature. The first experimental demonstration of two-mode squeezing in optics was by Heidmann et al.. More recently, two-mode squeezing was generated on-chip using a four-wave mixing OPO above threshold. Two-mode squeezing is often seen as a precursor to continuous-variable entanglement, and hence a demonstration of the Einstein-Podolsky-Rosen paradox in its original formulation in terms of continuous position and momentum observables. A two-mode squeezed vacuum (TMSV) state can be mathematically represented as,
,

and, writing down , in the photon number basis as,

If the individual modes of a TMSV are considered separately (i.e.), then tracing over or absorbing one of the modes leaves the remaining mode in a thermal state

with an effective average number of photons .

Based on the presence of a mean field
Squeezed states of light can be divided into squeezed vacuum and bright squeezed light, depending on the absence or presence of a non-zero mean field (also called a carrier), respectively. An optical parametric oscillator operated below threshold produces squeezed vacuum, whereas the same OPO operated above threshold produces bright squeezed light. Bright squeezed light can be advantageous for certain quantum information processing applications as it obviates the need of sending local oscillator to provide a phase reference, whereas squeezed vacuum is considered more suitable for quantum enhanced sensing applications. The AdLIGO and GEO600 gravitational wave detectors use squeezed vacuum to achieve enhanced sensitivity beyond the standard quantum limit.

Atomic spin squeezing

For squeezing of two-level neutral atom ensembles it is useful to consider the atoms as spin-1/2 particles with corresponding angular momentum operators defined as

Here  will correspond to the population difference in the two level system, i.e. for an equal superposition of the up and down state . The − plane represents the phase difference between the two states. This is also known as the Bloch sphere picture. For a coherent (unentangled) state, . Squeezing is here considered the redistribution of uncertainty from one variable (typically ) to another (typically ). If we consider a state pointing in the  direction, we can define the Wineland criterion for squeezing, or the metrological enhancement of the squeezed state as

.

The second factor is how much the coherence (the length of the Bloch vector) is reduced due to the squeezing procedure. Together these quantities tell you how much metrological enhancement the squeezing procedure gives. Here, metrological enhancement is the reduction in averaging time or atom number needed to make a measurement of a specific uncertainty. 20 dB of metrological enhancement means the same precision measurement can be made with 100 times fewer atoms or 100 times shorter averaging time.

Experimental realizations
There has been a whole variety of successful demonstrations of squeezed states. The first demonstrations were experiments with light fields using lasers and non-linear optics (see optical parametric oscillator). This is achieved by a simple process of four-wave mixing with a  crystal; similarly travelling wave phase-sensitive amplifiers generate spatially multimode quadrature-squeezed states of light when the  crystal is pumped in absence of any signal. Sub-Poissonian current sources driving semiconductor laser diodes have led to amplitude squeezed light.

Squeezed states have also been realized via motional states of an ion in a trap, phonon states in crystal lattices, and spin states in neutral atom ensembles. Much progress has been made on the creation and observation of spin squeezed states in ensembles of neutral atoms and ions, which can be used to enhancement measurements of time, accelerations, fields, and the current state of the art for measurement enhancement is 20 dB. Generation of spin squeezed states have been demonstrated using both coherent evolution of a coherent spin state and projective, coherence-preserving measurements. Even macroscopic oscillators were driven into classical motional states that were very similar to squeezed coherent states. Current state of the art in noise suppression, for laser radiation using squeezed light, amounts to 15 dB (as of 2016), which broke the previous record of 12.7 dB (2010).

Applications
Squeezed states of the light field can be used to enhance precision measurements. For example, phase-squeezed light can improve the phase read out of interferometric measurements (see for example gravitational waves). Amplitude-squeezed light can improve the readout of very weak spectroscopic signals.

Spin squeezed states of atoms can be used to improve the precision of atomic clocks. This is an important problem in atomic clocks and other sensors that use small ensembles of cold atoms where the quantum projection noise represents a fundamental limitation to the precision of the sensor.

Various squeezed coherent states, generalized to the case of many degrees of freedom, are used in various calculations in quantum field theory, for example Unruh effect and Hawking radiation, and generally, particle production in curved backgrounds and Bogoliubov transformations.

Recently, the use of squeezed states for quantum information processing in the continuous variables (CV) regime has been increasing rapidly. Continuous variable quantum optics uses squeezing of light as an essential resource to realize CV protocols for quantum communication, unconditional quantum teleportation and one-way quantum computing. This is in contrast to quantum information processing with single photons or photon pairs as qubits. CV quantum information processing relies heavily on the fact that squeezing is intimately related to quantum entanglement, as the quadratures of a squeezed state exhibit sub-shot-noise quantum correlations.

See also
Negative energy
Nonclassical light
Optical phase space
Quantum optics
Squeeze operator

References

External links
 Tutorial about quantum optics of the light field

Quantum optics